West Woodburn is a village in north-western Northumberland, England.

The 2001 census recorded a population of 492 in the Parish Council area of Corsenside of which West Woodburn is the main settlement.

West Woodburn lies on the line of Dere Street, a Roman road which linked Eboracum (York) to the area around Din Eidyn (Edinburgh), and thus later England to Scotland. To the west is the remains of a Roman fort known as Habitancum. The route is now the A68 road.

The River Rede, a major tributary of the River North Tyne, flows through the heart of the village. The river gives its name to the valley of Redesdale, as the local area is called.

 West Woodburn's most famous resident of recent times was PC Joseph Carroll, husband of Caroline Carroll, a primary school teacher. On 13 April 2006 PC Carroll was killed in a road traffic incident. PC Carroll was killed by Stephen Graham, a communications instructor at the Royal Military College, Sandhurst in an incident that was later found to be manslaughter. Mr Graham engaged the handbrake (at 70 mph) of the PC's patrol car whilst he was being taken to a cell for the night after being arrested. Since this incident regulations of the transport of people in police custody have been reviewed. It is believed that if PC Carroll had not been wearing his seat belt he would have survived the incident. Inspector Kerr Henry who was in the car with PC Carroll and Mr Graham was injured along with Graham.

Another little known, but extremely influential resident of West Woodburn, was Adam Telfer and his sheepdog Old Hemp. Telfer was a shepherd who lived in the village circa 1893 and is best known for being the man who first bred the Border Collie sheepdog.
A campaign was started to install a memorial to Telfer and Old Hemp, and permission was granted by the relevant authorities.
The memorial was unveiled on 8 September 2015.

Governance 

West Woodburn is in the parliamentary constituency of Hexham.

References

External links

Villages in Northumberland